The 2012 Changchun Yatai F.C. season is Changchun's 7th consecutive season in the Chinese Super League. Changchun will also be competing in the Chinese FA Cup.

Players

First team squad

Reserve squad

On loan

Competitions

Chinese Super League

League table

Matches

Chinese FA Cup

References

Changchun Yatai F.C. seasons
Changchun Yatai F.C.